Ninnu Choodalani is a 2001 Indian Telugu-language romantic drama film directed by V. R. Prathap, starring N. T. Rama Rao Jr. and Raveena Rajput in their debut. The film was not financially successful.

Plot
The twin cities sport two sweet shop giants in the form of Siva Reddy (K Vishwanath) and Sahadeva Reddy (Kaikala Satyanarayana). Venu (N. T. Rama Rao Jr.) is the teenage grandson of Siva Reddy and Siri (Raveena Rajput) is the granddaughter of Sahadeva Reddy. Venu happens to see Siri on the day of Holi and falls in love with her at the first sight. He gets hold of a photograph of her and then uses her photograph to put up a hoarding in Abids area asking her to call up his number. The parents of Siri notice their daughter's portrait on the advertisement of Siva Reddy sweets. The rivalry between Siva Reddy and Sahadeva Reddy intensifies. Siri falls in love with Venu, since she likes the kind of attention he gives to her, as she is a neglected girl in her house. Its elections time and Siva Reddy and Sahadeva Reddy are given MLA tickets from two opposition parties. Siva Reddy and Sahadeva Reddy advises their grandkids not to meet each other till the elections are completed. Venu packs up to Shimla along with his uncle as Siri visits her relative's village. Meanwhile, the parents of Siri try to arrange wedding for her. Fed up with this, Siri travels alone to Shimla in search of Venu. The rest of the story revolves around how the lovers get united and sort out the differences between the families.

Cast
 N. T. Rama Rao Jr. as Venu
 Raveena Rajput as Siri
 K. Viswanath as Siva Reddy
 Kaikala Satyanarayana as Sahadeva Reddy
 Annapoorna as Venu's grandmother
 Sivaji Raja as Venu's uncle
 Ramachandra as Venu's friend
 Maharshi Raghava
 Rallapalli
 Sudha

Soundtrack
The music was scored by veteran composer S. A. Rajkumar and Released by Mayuri Audio. The music was the only highlight of the film, with a mix of good melodies, and mass numbers.

Response

Jeevi of Idlebrain.com rated the film 2/5 and criticized the performances of the debutant actors. " Poor screenplay adds up to the poor emoting by the lead pair giving a torrid time", he added.

References

2000s Telugu-language films
2001 romantic drama films
2001 films
Indian romantic drama films
Films scored by S. A. Rajkumar